Pigritia uuku is a moth in the family Blastobasidae. It is found in Hawaii.

References

Natural History Museum Lepidoptera generic names catalog

Blastobasidae